Stope may refer to:

 Stope, Velike Lašče, a settlement in central Slovenia
 Stope, an underground space produced by stoping (mining)

Stopes may also refer to:

 Marie Stopes (1880-1958), Scottish palaeobotanist and pioneer in the field of family planning

See also 
 Stoping (geology)